Armenians in Hungary are ethnic Armenians living in Hungary.

History
The first Armenians to reach Hungary presumably arrived in the 10–11th century or even before. Armenians were present from early on in Hungary as clearly attested in a document issued by Hungarian King Ladislaus IV the Cuman (late 13th century). The inhabitants of the former capital of Armenia, Ani, moved to Moldavia, then, after some local conflicts, requested settlement in neighbouring Hungary. The local head of Transylvania (modern-day Romania), Prince Michael von Apaffy, gave approval for the resettlement of about 600 families; 55 families out of which received aristocracy and were even given higher titled later. They were allowed to found their own trading towns, the most notable one being Szamosújvár (today Gherla, Romania) called Armenopolis/Armenierstadt or Hayakaghak (Հայաքաղաք). They founded schools, built hospitals, joined the Hungarian army and contributed to the culture of Hungary. They gained positions, became teachers, medical doctors, priests, generals, ministers, etc. They preserved their culture - see the architecture, the ceilings of the churches in Gyergyószentmiklós, the cuisine - though they respected the Hungarian traditions. Many families Magyarized their family names.

Present day
Most modern Armenians in Hungary immigrated to the country after the dissolution of the USSR. Estimates of Armenians in Hungary range from 3,500 to 30,000 living in the nation today, making up roughly 0.01% of the population. Approximately, two thirds of Hungary's Armenians population is found in Budapest and the surrounding Pest county. Armenians in Hungary have established 31 "self-governments" and roughly half of them speak Armenian as their mother tongue. The Armenian Catholic Priesthood has existed in Hungary since 1924 and hosts a number of cultural programs, as does the Armenian Cultural and Information Centre in Budapest.

Notable Hungarians of Armenian heritage
Current ones:
 Tamás Aján, President of the  International Weightlifting Federation and former member of the International Olympics Committee
 Tristan Azbej, politician
Tigran Vardanjan, figure skater, Hungarian national champion in 2007-2009

Prides from the past with international success:
 Ilona Dajbukát, opera singer
 Marcell Jankovics, graphic, film maker, medalist in Cannes
 Líviusz Gyulai, graphic, printmaker, illustrator, awarded in Venice in 1970 and in Cannes 1999, medalist
 Pongrác Kacsóh (1873-1923), composer
 Miklós Kocsár (Kotcharian) (1933-2019), composer
 Gerő Mály (1884-1952), actor
 Stefánia Moldován, opera singer
Edgar Chahine, painter, born in Hungary, schooled in Venice, made his career in Paris
Oxendius Vărzărescu, mechitarist archbishop in Venice
Emil Telmányi (mother line: Akontz), violinist

Local prides from the past:
János Czetz (1822–1904), general, a prominent Hungarian freedom fighter, chief-of-staff of Hungarian army
 Gergely Csiky (1842- 1891), drama writer of 33 plays and several books like Greek Mythology; theater  is named after him
 István Gorove (family: Akontz) (1819-1881), politician, minister of agriculture, commerce
 Ernő Kiss, general (1799–1849), one of the main figures of the Hungarian Revolution of 1848, and one of the 13 Martyrs of Arad

20th century:
Gábor Agárdy (born Gábor Arklian), notable actor, "actor of the nation" (the highest civil rank and honor that an actor can have in Hungary)
László Endre (born Paskuian), writer
Vilmos Lázár, general (1817–1849), one of the main figures of the Hungarian Revolution of 1848, one of the 13 Martyrs of Arad
Zoltán Nuridsány (1925-1974), painter
Gergely Pongrátz (1932-2005), veteran of the Hungarian Revolution of 1956, Commander of the Corvin Passage (Corvin Köz)

See also
Armenian Diaspora
Demographics of Hungary
Armenia–Hungary relations

References

 in Hungarian: Gudenus János József: Örmény eredetű magyar nemesi családok genealógiája Erdélyi Örmény Gyökerek, Budapest, 2000
 in Hungarian: János József Gudenus: Genealogy of Hungaro-Armenian families, Budapest 2000.
 in Hungarian: Miklós Gazdovits: Az erdélyi örmények története

Hungary
Ethnic groups in Hungary